A tilmàtli (or tilma;) was a type of outer garment worn by men as a cloak/cape, documented from the late Postclassic and early Colonial eras among the Aztec and other peoples of central Mexico.

Styling
The garment was to be worn at the front like a long apron, or alternatively draped across the shoulders as a cloak. It was also frequently used as a carry-all.

Significance
Several different types of the garment were in use, designed for the various classes in society. 
Upper classes wore a tilmàtli of cotton cloth knotted over the right shoulder, while the middle class used a tilmàtli made of ayate fibre, a coarse fabric derived from the threads of the maguey agave. It was knotted over the left shoulder. The lower classes knotted the garment behind the neck, where it could serve for carrying.

Miraculous image

A very famous tilmàtli was that worn by Juan Diego in 1531; according to tradition, an image of the Virgin Mary appeared on it in the presence of the bishop of Mexico City. The image is preserved in the Basilica of Our Lady of Guadalupe which attracts millions of pilgrims annually.

Notes

References

Aztec clothing
Our Lady of Guadalupe